Time Out for Murder is a 1938 American crime film directed by H. Bruce Humberstone, written by Jerome Cady, and starring Gloria Stuart, Michael Whalen, Chick Chandler, Douglas Fowley, Robert Kellard, Jane Darwell and Jean Rogers. It was released on September 25, 1938, by 20th Century Fox.

Plot

Cast    
Gloria Stuart as Margie Ross
Michael Whalen as Barney Callahan
Chick Chandler as Snapper Doolan
Douglas Fowley as J.E. 'Dutch' Moran
Robert Kellard as Johnny Martin
Jane Darwell as Polly 
Jean Rogers as Helen Thomas
June Gale as Muriel
Ruth Hussey as Peggy Norton
Cliff Clark as Det. Capt. Collins
George Lynn as Henchman Blackie 
Eddie Marr as Eddie Morelli
Lester Matthews as Uncle Phillip Gregory

References

External links
 

1938 films
1930s English-language films
American crime films
1938 crime films
20th Century Fox films
Films directed by H. Bruce Humberstone
American black-and-white films
1930s American films